Chelakkara is a small town in Thrissur district of Kerala.

Geography

Politics
Chelakkara assembly constituency (SC) is part of Alathur.
 It is also the constituency of ex-Speaker  of Kerala  Assembly and minister of kerala K. Radhakrishnan.

References

Cities and towns in Thrissur district